Đình Lập is a rural district of Lạng Sơn province in the Northeastern region of Vietnam. As of 2003 the district had a population of 28,125. The district covers an area of 1,183 km². The district capital lies at Đình Lập.

Administrative divisions
Đình Lập, Nông Trường Thái Bình, Lâm Ca, Đồng Thắng, Bắc Lãng, Châu Sơn,  Cường Lợi, Thái Bình, Đình Lập, Bính Xá, Kiên Mộc, Bắc Xa.

References

Districts of Lạng Sơn province
Lạng Sơn province